The Diamond Y springsnail, scientific name Tryonia adamantina,  is a species of small freshwater snail with a gill and an operculum, an aquatic gastropod mollusk in the family Hydrobiidae.

The species is endemic to the United States. The common name is a reference to the Diamond Y Spring which is on the Diamond Y Spring Preserve in West Texas, a cienaga system.

References

 2006 IUCN Red List of Threatened Species.   Downloaded on 7 August 2007.
 About the Diamond Y Spring Preserve

Endemic fauna of the United States
Molluscs of the United States
Tryonia
Gastropods described in 1987
Taxonomy articles created by Polbot
Taxobox binomials not recognized by IUCN